Jane Lee may refer to:

Jane Lee (actress) (1912–1957), American child actress
Jane Lee (politician) (born 1979), Li Mei-jhen, Taiwanese politician
Jane Lee (mountaineer) (born 1984), Singaporean mountain climber